Alfie is a soundtrack album to the film of the same name, released in 2004. It was produced and performed by Mick Jagger and David A. Stewart, with contributions from Joss Stone, Sheryl Crow and Nadirah "Nadz" Seid.

The original 1966 film for which this was a remake, also had a soundtrack album by Sonny Rollins. The Burt Bacharach-Hal David song Alfie which played over the end credits of both films, did not feature in the Rollins soundtrack, but it appears here. The song, “New York Hustle” is the losing song for the New York Rangers for home games.

Track listing
"Old Habits Die Hard" – Mick Jagger and David A. Stewart  
"Blind Leading the Blind" (Live Acoustic Version) – Mick Jagger and David A. Stewart 
"New York Hustle" – Mick Jagger and David A. Stewart
"Let's Make It Up" – Mick Jagger and David A. Stewart
"Wicked Time" – Joss Stone and Nadirah "Nadz" Seid, featuring Mick Jagger
"Lonely Without You (This Christmas)" – Mick Jagger and Joss Stone
"Darkness of Your Love" – Gary "Mudbone" Cooper and David A. Stewart
"Jack the Lad" – Mick Jagger and David A. Stewart
"Oh Nikki" – Mick Jagger and David A. Stewart
"Blind Leading the Blind" – Mick Jagger and David A. Stewart
"Standing in the Rain" – Mick Jagger and David A. Stewart
"Counting the Days" – Mick Jagger and David A. Stewart
"Old Habits Reprise" – Mick Jagger and David A. Stewart
"Alfie" – Joss Stone
"Old Habits Die Hard" – Mick Jagger and David A. Stewart, featuring Sheryl Crow

For the song "Old Habits Die Hard" Mick Jagger and David A. Stewart won the BFCA Award, Golden Globe, Sierra Award and the World Soundtrack Award.

Personnel
Mick Jagger - vocals, guitar, harmonica, percussion
Dave Stewart, Ally McErline, Sam Stewart, Jesse Davey, Steve Donnelly - guitar 
Chris Sharrock, Virgil Donati - drums
Yolanda Charles, Robin Davey - bass
Mike Rowe - keyboards, piano
Ned Douglas - programming
Adrien Cooke, Raymond Anger - organ 
Jeff Bova - organ, piano
John Powell, James Pearson - piano
Beverly Skeete, Katy Perry, Kaya Jones, Royce Nelson, Claudia Fontaine, Faye Simpson - backing vocals
The Kick Horns - brass

Charts

References

Further reading
 Mick Jagger Shines on Alfie soundtrack

Albums produced by Mick Jagger
Albums produced by David A. Stewart
Mick Jagger albums
2004 soundtrack albums
EMI Records soundtracks
Drama film soundtracks
Comedy film soundtracks